Julia Dean (May 13, 1878 – October 17, 1952) was a stage and film actress who began her career in the 1890s.

Biography
Julia Dean was born to Albert Clay Dean and Susan Jane Morton in St. Paul, Minnesota, in 1878. She had a sister Eloise and a brother. She made her Broadway debut December 1, 1902 in The Altars of Friendship. She toured with Joseph Jefferson and James Neill. In 1907 she appeared with Maclyn Arbuckle in The Round-Up. She worked for producers William A. Brady and David Belasco.

She began making silent pictures in 1915 and continued until 1919. She then devoted her career to the stage until 1944 when she returned to films in The Curse of the Cat People. She continued to appear in film noir classics like Nightmare Alley lending her white-haired support in many uncredited roles. She died in Hollywood in 1952.

Family
She was married to Frank Slocum (aka Orme Caldara; 1875–1925) from 1906 to 1913. She was the niece of 19th-century actress Julia Dean.

Filmography

Silent
How Molly Made Good (1915) (* herself; cameo appearance, with her sister Eloise) - Herself
Judge Not; or The Woman of Mona Diggings (1915) - Molly Hanlon
Matrimony (1915, Short) - Diana Rossmore
The Ransom (1916) - Janet Osborne
Rasputin, the Black Monk (1917) - Mme. Vasta, Lady in waiting
Ruling Passions (1918) - Eveline Roland
A Society Exile (1919) - Lady Doris Furnival
An Honorable Cad (1919, Short)

Sound
The Curse of the Cat People (1944) - Mrs. Julia Farren
Experiment Perilous (1944) - Deria
Do You Love Me (1946) - Mrs. Allen (uncredited)
O.S.S. (1946) - Madame Prideaux
Out of the Blue (1947) - Miss Ritchie
Magic Town (1947) - Mrs. Wilton
Nightmare Alley (1947) - Addie Peabody (uncredited)
The Emperor Waltz (1948) - Archduchess Stephanie
Easy Living (1949) - Mrs. Belle Ryan
Girls' School (1950) - Emily Matthews
People Will Talk (1951) - Old Lady (uncredited)
Elopement (1951) - Mrs. Simpson (uncredited)
At Sword's Point (1952) - Madame D'Artagnan (uncredited)
You for Me (1952) - Aunt Clara Chadwick (uncredited) (final film role)

References

External links

Julia Dean gallery NY Public Library
Julia Dean portraits University of Washington; Sayre collection

1878 births
1952 deaths
American stage actresses
American silent film actresses
American film actresses
Actresses from Saint Paul, Minnesota
20th-century American actresses
Burials at Forest Lawn Memorial Park (Glendale)